The lands common to Axminster and Kilmington civil parishes are an area of meadowland on the banks of the River Axe that is shared between the civil parishes of Axminster and Kilmington in East Devon.  The lands common to the two parishes are close to Newenham Abbey, which is in the parish of Axminster.

303 people live on the lands common to Axminster and Kilmington.

Some contemporary administrative documents treat "Lands common to Axminster and Kilmington" as the name of a civil parish in its own right (similar variations on this name are also used).

References 

Civil parishes in Devon
East Devon District